Godmanstone (or Godmanston) is a village and civil parish in the county of Dorset in southern England, situated approximately  north of the county town Dorchester. Its name means Godman's Farm and it is sited by the River Cerne amongst chalk hills of the Dorset Downs. Dorset County Council's latest (2013) estimate of the parish population is 130. In the 2011 census the population of Godmanstone parish combined with the small adjoining parish of Nether Cerne was 156.

Godmanstone used to have a pub—The Smiths Arms—which claimed to be the smallest in Britain. The story attached to the claim was that the original licence was granted by King Charles II when he requested that the village smith serve him a glass of porter. The smith refused because he had no licence, so Charles granted him one on the spot and was served his drink. The licence only applied to the smithy; adjacent living quarters, subsequently used by drinkers, were larger. The business has since closed.

Francis Cottington, 1st Baron Cottington (ca.1579–1652) came from Godmonston. He was the English lord treasurer and ambassador and leader of the pro-Spanish, pro-Roman Catholic faction in the court of Charles I.

The parish church is partly Norman, chiefly perpendicular, with a tower; and was recently repaired.

References

External links
 Flight of Prince Charles from Worcester

Villages in Dorset